"El Rio" is a 1968 song by Miguel Ríos, composed by Fernando Arbex. The song was the artist's first major hit. and has been covered by other artists including Joan Manuel Serrat.

References

1968 songs
Songs written by Fernando Arbex
Miguel Bosé songs